The discography of Bastille, a British indie pop band, consists of four studio albums, twelve extended plays, thirty singles and thirty-one music videos. Originally a solo project by Dan Smith, Bastille was formed in 2010. The band released its debut single "Flaws" / "Icarus" in July 2011 on the independent record label Young and Lost Club. An extended play titled Laura Palmer followed later that year. The critical success of the EP and extensive touring brought the group to the attention of Virgin Records, which signed them in December 2011.

Bastille released their debut studio album, Bad Blood, in March 2013. The album reached number one on the United Kingdom albums chart and the top ten of the Irish albums chart. It has been certified triple platinum by the British Phonographic Industry (BPI) and platinum by the Recording Industry Association of America (RIAA). The band released six singles from the album: "Overjoyed", "Bad Blood", "Flaws", "Pompeii", "Laura Palmer", and "Things We Lost in the Fire", with "Pompeii" peaking at number two on the UK Singles Chart and topping the charts in Ireland and Scotland. "Pompeii" reached number five on the Billboard Hot 100 and has been certified 6× Platinum by the RIAA.

In November 2013, Bastille released a re-issue album All This Bad Blood, which features songs from the extended edition of Bad Blood and their mixtapes, as well as two new songs. The band released two singles from the album: "Oblivion" and "Of the Night", a mash-up of the songs "The Rhythm of the Night" by Corona and "Rhythm Is a Dancer" by Snap!.

On 8 December 2014, Bastille released their third mixtape, VS. (Other People's Heartache, Pt. III), which included collaborations with Haim ("Bite Down"), Angel Haze ("Weapon"), MNEK ("bad_news"), Grades ("Torn Apart"), and Rag'n'Bone Man and Skunk Anansie ("Remains").

On 16 June 2016 "Good Grief" was released and went on to reach number 13 on the UK Singles Chart and is certified Platinum. The album, Wild World, was released on 9 September and reached number one on the UK Albums Chart for two consecutive weeks. It reached number two in Belgium and Ireland, and top 5 in Austria, Switzerland and US. Three more singles were released from the album: "Send Them Off!", "Blame" and "Glory".

"I Know You", Craig David featuring Bastille, was released as the second single from David's seventh album, The Time Is Now on 23 November 2017. It reached number 5 on the UK Singles Chart and number 2 in Scotland.

"Happier", a collaboration with Marshmello, was released on 17 August 2018. It reached number two on the UK Singles Chart, tying with "Pompeii" and "Of the Night", and number two in the US, eclipsing "Pompeii". It reached the top 5 in Australia, Ireland and Sweden amongst others. It is certified double platinum by the BPI, and six-times platinum by the RIAA and the Australian Recording Industry Association (ARIA).

On 7 December 2018, Bastille released their fourth mixtape, Other People's Heartache, Pt. 4, which included collaborations with: Kianja ("Wild World (Intro)"); Kianja, Craig David and S-X ("Would I Lie to You?"); Seeb ("Grip"); Kianja, Craig David and Swarmz ("Don't Let Go (Love)"); Rationale, James Arthur ("Flowers"); Lily Moore, Moss Kena and Jacob Banks ("The Descent"); and Moss Kena ("Warmth (Outro)").

The band's third studio album, Doom Days, was released on 14 June 2019, preceded by four singles: "Quarter Past Midnight", "Doom Days", "Joy" and "Those Nights". The album reached top 5 in both the UK and USA. The album was re-issued as an extended album, Doom Days (This Got Out of Hand), on 6 December 2019. Two singles have been released since, a duet with Canadian singer Alessia Cara of their song "Another Place" and "Can't Fight This Feeling", a cover of the REO Speedwagon song, with the latter becoming the band's ninth UK top 40 single.

Albums

Studio albums

Re-issues

Remix albums

Mixtapes

Extended plays

Singles

As lead artist

As featured artist

Promotional singles

Other charted songs

Guest appearances

Music videos

Remixes

Notes

References

External links
 
 

Alternative rock discographies
Discographies of British artists
Discography